Megaloblatta is a genus of cockroaches in the family Ectobiidae.

Megaloblatta, like many other insects, use stridulation in order to steer their predators away. The stridulating insects are less likely to be preyed upon in comparison to individuals of the species with an inability to stridulate.

Range 
Megaloblatta are found in Mexico, Costa Rica, Panama, Nicaragua, Peru, Colombia, and Ecuador.

See also 

 List of largest insects

References 

Cockroaches
Cockroach genera
Insects of Mexico
Arthropods of Colombia
Fauna of Costa Rica
Fauna of Nicaragua
Fauna of Panama
Invertebrates of Ecuador
Invertebrates of Peru
Insects of Central America